Øyre is a mountain in Vang Municipality in Innlandet county, Norway. The mountain is surrounded by several other notable mountains including Tverrfjellet, Skoddetinden, and Kljåkinnknippene to the northwest; Ørnenosi to the southwest; Storebotteggi to the south; Rankonosi and Ranastongi to the southeast; and Grindane to the east.

See also
List of mountains of Norway by height

References

Vang, Innlandet
Mountains of Innlandet